The Norwich City Player of the Season award is voted for annually by Norwich City's supporters, in recognition of the best overall performance by an individual player throughout the football season. As a mark of respect, the trophy is named The Barry Butler memorial trophy, after the club captain who was killed in a car accident on 9 April 1966.

This is the more prestigious of two official Norwich City awards, the other being the Young Player of the Year accolade. The 2003–04 winner Craig Fleming made clear just how important this award is to Norwich City players, "It is something you dream of winning... it is such a prestigious award". Other awards available are awarded by other bodies, namely the Capital Canaries, Norwich City Independent Supporters Association, and the "Ambassador Club".

Since the inaugural award was made to Terry Allcock in 1967, nine players have won the award twice, and one, Grant Holt, has won the award three times, in 2010, 2011 and 2012. World Cup winner Martin Peters was the first to win the trophy in consecutive seasons, a feat since emulated by strikers Kevin Drinkell and Iwan Roberts, as well as Holt. Two winners have gone on to manage the club, Dave Stringer, the 1972 winner, and double-winner Bryan Gunn.

Voting mechanism
This award is voted for by the fans of the club. Toward the end of the season, fans are invited to vote, either by submitting a paper slip to the club's Carrow Road offices, or by email or text message, with the winner being the player that polls the most votes. A percentage of the votes from the 'Player of the Month' awards throughout the season also count towards the final votes for Player of the year.

List of winners

† Player currently on the playing staff of the club

Summary of wins by playing position

Summary of wins by country

Footnotes

References

 
Association football player of the year awards by club in England
Association football player non-biographical articles
Norwich City F.C.-related lists